Frontier Town is a 1938 American Western film directed by Ray Taylor and starring Tex Ritter, Karl Hackett and Ann Evers.

Plot

Cast
 Tex Ritter as Tex Lansing, alias Tex Rawlins
 Ann Evers as Gail Hawthorne
 Horace Murphy as Stubby
 Snub Pollard as 	Peewee
 Karl Hackett as Nat Regan
 Charles King as Henchman Pete Denby
 Forrest Taylor as Sheriff Walsh of Frontier
 Ed Cassidy as Sheriff Jack Lane of Prairie City 
 Marion Feducha as Bob Hawthorne 
 Jack C. Smith as 	Pop Pearson 
 Lynton Brent as Henchman Grayson
 White Flash as Flash, Tex's Horse

References

Bibliography
James Robert Parish & Michael R. Pitts. Film directors: a guide to their American films. Scarecrow Press, 1974.

External links
 

1938 films
1938 Western (genre) films
American Western (genre) films
Films directed by Ray Taylor
Grand National Films films
1930s English-language films
1930s American films